Frank Bruno is a paralympic athlete from Canada competing mainly in category F37  events.

Frank competed in the 1992 Summer Paralympics winning the gold medal in the 100m, 200m and 400m giving him a clean sweep of the sprint medals as well as competing in the long jump.  At the 1996 Summer Paralympics he competed in the shot put but failed to medal. In 1998, Bruno became part of the Canadian Disability Hall of Fame.

References

Paralympic track and field athletes of Canada
Athletes (track and field) at the 1992 Summer Paralympics
Athletes (track and field) at the 1996 Summer Paralympics
Paralympic gold medalists for Canada
Living people
Medalists at the 1992 Summer Paralympics
Year of birth missing (living people)
Paralympic medalists in athletics (track and field)
Canadian male sprinters
Canadian Disability Hall of Fame